George Nigel Capel-Cure JP DL TD (28 September 1908 – 8 August 2004) was an English cricketer. He was a left-handed batsman and leg-break bowler who played a single game in his entire career for Essex during the 1929 season.

Capel Cure was born in Kensington.  He was educated at Eton College and Trinity College, Cambridge

Capel Cure played just one game for Essex, in the 1929 season, of a drawn match against his alma mater Cambridge University. Batting at number four, Capel Cure was trapped leg-before wicket by Trevil Morgan in his first innings for a duck, and scored just six runs in the second innings before being caught and bowled by Gordon Chandler.

Bowling, he took 2–58 in the Essex first innings; his wickets were of Tom Killick (lbw, but only after he'd scored a double century) and George Kemp-Welch (also lbw) in the Cambridge 1st innings.  Cambridge did not complete their 2nd innings.

Capel Cure's brother-in-law was Gerald Barry, who played one first-class match for the Combined Services in 1922.

Capel Cure was a landowner in Shropshire and Essex. He received the Territorial Decoration. He was High Sheriff of Essex in 1951–52 and deputy lord-lieutenant of the county from 1958 to 1978. He lived at Blake Hall, near Ongar.  He died in Harlow.

References

External links
Nigel Capel-Cure at Cricket Archive

1908 births
2004 deaths
English cricketers
Essex cricketers
High Sheriffs of Essex
People educated at Eton College
Alumni of Trinity College, Cambridge
People from Epping Forest District